Scoring A Century is an opera with music by English composer David Blake. The libretto was written by Opera Director Keith Warner. It is described as a 'low entertainment for highbrows, or vice versa'.

It tells the history of Mr and Mrs Jedermann, a couple of song and dance merchants, and incidentally of the twentieth century too.

The Jedermanns stumble through the momentous events, politics and social change of the last one hundred years, never ageing and only begrudgingly developing. Their sole aim is to provide some songs and snatches, to raise a laugh or provoke a tear. The form the piece adopts is more that of musical comedy than opera. It is a modern Singspiel, a review of a century in nineteen panels. There is dialogue and songs, but from time to time the action is interrupted by through-composed mini-operas which contain the serious, imaginative heart of the show.

Performance history
Scoring a Century was originally conceived as part of the millennium celebrations. Scenes from the work were premiered by the University of York Music Department in November 1999 whilst the complete work was being lined up to debut at Portland Opera, Oregon. Just as plans were beginning to finalise, however, the US] suffered the 9/11 terrorist attacks. “After 9/11, American opera houses immediately lost their budgets and Portland Opera decided to do Bohèmes and Magic Flutes instead,” Blake says. “It was a big disappointment.”

On March 4, 2010 the Opera received its World Premiere at the Crescent Theatre, Birmingham, by students from the Birmingham Conservatoire vocal department, directed by  Warner and conducted by Lionel Friend.

Roles

References

External links
 Review by Chris Morley in Birmingham Post
 Review by Geoff Read at Musicweb-international.com

Singspiele
English-language operas
Operas
1999 operas
2010 operas